Hurn v. Oursler, 289 U.S. 238 (1933), was a United States Supreme Court case in which the Court held A significant federal question raised by a suit can give jurisdiction to federal courts. If the federal question is rejected on the merits, the federal court still has jurisdiction to decide the local question on the merits.

The case being discussed was a copyright infringement suit.

In United States v. United States Gypsum Co., the Court's majority opinion referred to Hurn v. Oursler in passing. Justice Felix Frankfurter expanded this and recounted the case's background in his concurrence as a key point in his argument.

References

External links
 

1933 in United States case law
United States Supreme Court cases
United States Supreme Court cases of the Hughes Court